Jaleswar Assembly constituency may refer to 
 Jaleswar, Assam Assembly constituency
 Jaleswar, Odisha Assembly constituency